Austin Lee McRae (October 25, 1861 – March 18, 1922) was an American football coach, physics professor, and university director. 

He served as the head football coach at the University of Missouri in 1890 and at the Missouri School of Mines and Metallurgy—now Missouri University of Science and Technology—from 1893 to 1899, compiling a career college football coaching record of 4–8. McRae taught physics at the Missouri School of Mines from 1891 to 1894, then at the University of Texas until 1896. After work as a consulting engineer in St. Louis, McRae returned to MSM in 1899 and was the director of the school from 1915 to 1920.

Head coaching record

References

External links
 

1861 births
1922 deaths
19th-century American educators
Missouri S&T Miners football coaches
Missouri S&T Miners football players
Missouri Tigers football coaches
University of Texas faculty
Missouri University of Science and Technology faculty